José Luis Vargas, commonly known as "El Grillo" (born June 23, 1963), is a Dominican former professional basketball player.

College career
Vargas played college basketball for Louisiana State University.

Professional career
Vargas was drafted in the second round of the 1988 National Basketball Association Draft by the Dallas Mavericks. He never played in the NBA, though, instead leaving to play in the Italian league.

He played for Maccabi Tel Aviv from 1991-1993.

He played with Club de Regatas Vasco da Gama.

References

External links
Italian League (Serie A) statistics 
Puerto Rican League (Baloncesto Superior Nacional) statistics 

1963 births
Living people
Centers (basketball)
Cholet Basket players
CR Vasco da Gama basketball players
Dallas Mavericks draft picks
Dominican Republic expatriate basketball people in Argentina
Dominican Republic expatriate basketball people in Brazil
Dominican Republic expatriate basketball people in Chile
Dominican Republic expatriate basketball people in France
Dominican Republic expatriate basketball people in Italy
Dominican Republic expatriate basketball people in Israel
Dominican Republic expatriate basketball people in Portugal
Dominican Republic expatriate basketball people in Puerto Rico
Dominican Republic expatriate basketball people in the United States
Dominican Republic expatriate basketball people in Venezuela
Dominican Republic men's basketball players
Franca Basquetebol Clube players
Libertad de Sunchales basketball players
LSU Tigers basketball players
Maccabi Tel Aviv B.C. players
Nuova Pallacanestro Gorizia players
Pallacanestro Virtus Roma players
Power forwards (basketball)
Pan American Games silver medalists for the Dominican Republic
Pan American Games medalists in basketball
Saint-Quentin Basket-Ball players
Trotamundos B.B.C. players
UniCEUB/BRB players
Unitri/Uberlândia basketball players
Basketball players at the 2003 Pan American Games
Medalists at the 2003 Pan American Games